Keen Mountain Correctional Center is a level 4, maximum security correctional facility in Oakwood, Virginia. It opened in 1990 and houses up to 1200 adult male offenders.

Notable inmates
 George Huguely

References

Prisons in Virginia
Buildings and structures in Buchanan County, Virginia